The Bulgarian Basketball Federation also known as (BFB) is the national governing body of basketball in Bulgaria. They organize national competitions in Bulgaria for the Bulgaria men's national basketball team, and Bulgaria women's national basketball team. 

The top level professional league is the National Basketball League.

See also 
Bulgaria national basketball team

Basketball in Bulgaria
Basketball
Basketball governing bodies in Europe
1935 establishments in Bulgaria